Frederick Bergendahl (February 26, 1858 – December 15, 1889) was a United States Army private who served in the American Indian Wars and received the Medal of Honor.

Biography
He and fellow Private John Francis O'Sullivan distinguished themselves in this battle, and after nearly all the renegades had been killed, O'Sullivan pursued the last surviving Indian but was unable to catch him. Both Bergendahl and O'Sullivan received the Medal of Honor, as well as Lieutenant Lewis Warrington, for gallantry at the Staked Plains on October 13, 1875. Bergendahl was born and buried in Gothenburg, Sweden.

Medal of Honor citation
 For gallantry in a long chase after Indians on 8 December 1874, while serving with the Band of the 4th U.S. Cavalry, in action at Staked Plains, Texas.

References

 

1858 births
1889 deaths
Military personnel from Gothenburg
United States Army soldiers
American military personnel of the Indian Wars
United States Army Medal of Honor recipients
Foreign-born Medal of Honor recipients
American Indian Wars recipients of the Medal of Honor